Robert Griffin Richards (born October 2, 1938) is a former professional American football defensive lineman in the National Football League (NFL). He played six seasons for the Philadelphia Eagles and the Atlanta Falcons.

References

1938 births
Living people
People from Columbus, Mississippi
Players of American football from Mississippi
American football defensive ends
American football defensive tackles
LSU Tigers football players
Philadelphia Eagles players
Atlanta Falcons players